Russian-born German DJ Zedd has released two studio albums, one compilation album, 13 music videos, three extended plays, 37 singles (including two as a featured artist) and 30 remixes.

Albums

Studio albums

Compilation album

Extended plays

Singles

As lead artist

As featured artist

Other appearances

Video games
Zedd has a total of 3 songs which appear in the Dance Dance Revolution (DDR) arcade series. One of these, "Break Free", was also present in Dance Rush.

Production discography

Remixes

Music videos

As lead artist

As featured artist

Notes

References

Discography
Discographies of German artists
House music discographies